Pablo Cuevas was the three-time defending champion, but lost in the semifinals to Fabio Fognini.

Fognini went on to win the title, defeating Nicolás Jarry in the final, 1–6, 6–1, 6–4.

Seeds
The top four seeds receive a bye into the second round.

Draw

Finals

Top half

Bottom half

Qualifying

Seeds

Qualifiers

Qualifying draw

First qualifier

Second qualifier

Third qualifier

Fourth qualifier

References
 Main draw
 Qualifying draw

Singles